The 2024 NHL Entry Draft will be the 62nd NHL Entry Draft. The draft is expected to be held in June 2024.

Eligibility
Ice hockey players born between January 1, 2004, and September 15, 2006, are eligible for selection in the 2024 NHL Entry Draft. Additionally, un-drafted, non-North American players born in 2003 are eligible for the draft; and those players who were drafted in the 2022 NHL Entry Draft, but not signed by an NHL team and who were born after June 30, 2004, are also eligible to re-enter the draft.

Traded picks
The order of the 2024 Entry Draft will be finalized upon the conclusion of the 2023–24 NHL season. However, some teams have already exchanged picks for this draft via trade. These picks are listed below.

Round one
No traded picks for this round

Round two
 The Boston Bruins' second-round pick will go to the Anaheim Ducks as the result of a trade on March 19, 2022, that sent Hampus Lindholm and Kodie Curran to Boston in exchange for Urho Vaakanainen, John Moore, a first-round pick in 2022, a second-round pick in 2023 and this pick.
 The Colorado Avalanche's second-round pick will go to the Montreal Canadiens as the result of a trade on March 21, 2022, that sent Artturi Lehkonen to Colorado in exchange for Justin Barron and this pick.
 The Florida Panthers' second-round pick will go to the Arizona Coyotes as a result of a trade on July 26, 2021, that sent a seventh-round pick in 2023 to Florida in exchange for Anton Stralman, Vladislav Kolyachonok and this pick.
 The Montreal Canadiens' second-round pick will go to the Arizona Coyotes as a result of a trade on September 4, 2021, that sent Christian Dvorak to Montreal in exchange for a conditional first-round pick in 2022 and this pick.
 The Philadelphia Flyers' second-round pick will go to the Carolina Hurricanes as the result of a trade on July 8, 2022, that sent Tony DeAngelo and a seventh-round pick in 2022 to Philadelphia in exchange for a fourth-round pick in 2022, a conditional third-round pick in 2023 and this pick.
 The Tampa Bay Lightning's second-round pick will go to the Nashville Predators as the result of a trade on February 26, 2023, that sent Tanner Jeannot to Tampa Bay in exchange for Cal Foote, a conditional first-round pick in 2025, a third, fourth and fifth-round pick all in 2023 and this pick.
 The Toronto Maple Leafs' second-round pick will go to the St. Louis Blues as the result of a trade on February 17, 2023, that sent Noel Acciari and Josh Pillar to Toronto in exchange for Adam Gaudette, Mikhail Abramov, a first-round pick in 2023, Ottawa's third-round pick in 2023 and this pick.
 The Vancouver Canucks' second-round pick will go to the Chicago Blackhawks as the result of a trade on October 7, 2022, that sent Riley Stillman to Vancouver in exchange for Jason Dickinson and this pick.
 The Washington Capitals' second-round pick will go to the Ottawa Senators as the result of a trade on July 13, 2022, that sent Connor Brown to Washington in exchange for this pick.
 The Winnipeg Jets' second-round pick will go to the Nashville Predators as the result of a trade on February 25, 2023, that sent Nino Niederreiter to Winnipeg in exchange for this pick.

Round three
 The Boston Bruins' third-round pick will go to the Washington Capitals as the result of a trade on February 23, 2023, that sent Garnet Hathaway and Andrei Svetlakov to Boston in exchange for Craig Smith, a first-round pick in 2023, a second-round pick in 2025 and this pick.
 The Colorado Avalanche's third-round pick will go to the Arizona Coyotes as the result of a trade on July 28, 2021, that sent Darcy Kuemper to Colorado in exchange for Conor Timmins, a conditional first-round pick in 2022 and this pick (being conditional at the time of the trade). The condition – Arizona will receive a third-round pick in 2024 if Colorado wins the 2022 Stanley Cup and Kuemper plays in 50% or more of their playoff games – was converted on June 26, 2022.
 The Edmonton Oilers' third-round pick will go to the Arizona Coyotes as the result of a trade on July 7, 2022, that sent Colorado's first-round pick in 2022 to Edmonton in exchange for Zack Kassian, a first-round pick in 2022, a second-round pick in 2025 and this pick.
 The Los Angeles Kings' third-round pick will go to the Columbus Blue Jackets as the result of a trade on March 1, 2023, that sent Joonas Korpisalo and Vladislav Gavrikov to Los Angeles in exchange for Jonathan Quick, a conditional first-round pick in 2023 and this pick.
 The Minnesota Wild's third-round pick will go to the Washington Capitals as the result of a trade on February 28, 2023, that sent Marcus Johansson to Minnesota in exchange for this pick.
 The New York Islanders' third-round pick will go to the Toronto Maple Leafs as the result of a trade on February 28, 2023, that sent Pierre Engvall to New York in exchange for this pick.
 The Ottawa Senators' third-round pick will go to the Chicago Blackhawks as the result of a trade on July 7, 2022, that sent Alex DeBrincat to Ottawa in exchange for a first and second-round pick in 2022 and this pick.
 The Pittsburgh Penguins' third-round pick will go to the Anaheim Ducks as the result of a trade on March 3, 2023, that sent Dmitry Kulikov to Pittsburgh in exchange for Brock McGinn and this pick.
 The San Jose Sharks' third-round pick will go to the Anaheim Ducks as the result of a trade on February 28, 2023, that sent Henry Thrun to San Jose in exchange for this pick.
 The Toronto Maple Leafs' third-round pick will go to the Seattle Kraken as the result of a trade on March 20, 2022, that sent Mark Giordano and Colin Blackwell to Toronto in exchange for a second-round pick in both 2022 and 2023 and this pick.
 The Vegas Golden Knights' third-round pick will go to the Pittsburgh Penguins as the result of a trade on March 1, 2023, that sent Teddy Blueger to Vegas in exchange for Peter Diliberatore and this pick.

Round four
 The Chicago Blackhawks' fourth-round pick will go to the Tampa Bay Lightning as the result of a trade on March 18, 2022, that sent Boris Katchouk, Taylor Raddysh, a conditional first-round pick in 2023 and 2024 to Chicago in exchange for Brandon Hagel, a fourth-round pick in 2022 and this pick.
 The Dallas Stars' fourth-round pick will go to the Detroit Red Wings as the result of a trade on March 21, 2022, that sent Vladislav Namestnikov to Dallas in exchange for this pick.
 The Edmonton Oilers' fourth-round pick will go to the Nashville Predators as the result of a trade on February 28, 2023, that sent Mattias Ekholm and a sixth-round pick in 2024 to Edmonton in exchange for Tyson Barrie, Reid Schaefer, a first-round pick in 2023 and this pick.
 The New Jersey Devils' fourth-round pick will go to the Vancouver Canucks as the result of a trade on March 3, 2023, that sent Curtis Lazar to New Jersey in exchange for this pick.
 The San Jose Sharks' fourth-round pick will go to the Arizona Coyotes as the result of a trade on July 28, 2021, that sent Lane Pederson to San Jose in exchange for this pick.
 The Tampa Bay Lightning's fourth-round pick will go to the Ottawa Senators as the result of a trade on March 20, 2022, that sent Nick Paul to Tampa Bay in exchange for Mathieu Joseph and this pick.
 The Vegas Golden Knights' fourth-round pick will go to the San Jose Sharks as the result of a trade on August 29, 2022, that sent Adin Hill to Vegas in exchange for this pick.

Round five
 The Buffalo Sabres' fifth-round pick will go to the Minnesota Wild as the result of a trade on March 3, 2023, that sent Jordan Greenway to Buffalo in exchange for Vegas' second-round pick in 2023 and this pick.
 The Calgary Flames' fifth-round pick will go to the Chicago Blackhawks as the result of a trade on March 21, 2022, that sent Ryan Carpenter to Calgary in exchange for this pick.
 The Colorado Avalanche's fifth-round pick will go to the New Jersey Devils as the result of a trade on February 26, 2023, that sent Shakir Mukhamadullin, Nikita Okhotiuk, Andreas Johnsson, Fabian Zetterlund, a conditional first-round pick in 2023, a conditional second-round pick in 2024 and a seventh-round pick in 2024 to San Jose in exchange for Timo Meier, Timur Ibragimov, Scott Harrington, Santeri Hatakka, Zachary Emond and this pick.
San Jose previously acquired this pick as the result of a trade on March 21, 2022, that sent Andrew Cogliano to Colorado in exchange for this pick.
 The Los Angeles Kings' fifth-round pick will go to the Philadelphia Flyers as the result of a trade on March 3, 2023, that sent Zack MacEwen to Los Angeles in exchange for Brendan Lemieux and this pick.
 The Philadelphia Flyers' fifth-round pick will go to the Florida Panthers as the result of a trade on March 19, 2022, that sent Owen Tippett, a third-round pick in 2023 and a conditional first-round pick in 2024 to Philadelphia in exchange for Claude Giroux, German Rubtsov, Connor Bunnaman and this pick.
 The San Jose Sharks' fifth-round pick will go to the Montreal Canadiens as the result of a trade on March 3, 2013, that sent Arvid Henriksson to San Jose in exchange for Nick Bonino and this pick.

Round six
 The Nashville Predators' sixth-round pick will go to the Edmonton Oilers as the result of a trade on February 28, 2023, that sent Tyson Barrie, Reid Schaefer, a first-round pick in 2023 and a fourth-round pick in 2024 to Nashville in exchange for Mattias Ekholm and this pick.

Round seven
 The Boston Bruins' seventh-round pick will go to the Arizona Coyotes as the result of a trade on February 22, 2022, that sent Michael Callahan to Boston in exchange for this pick.
 The Calgary Flames' seventh-round pick will go to the Seattle Kraken as the result of a trade on March 16, 2022, that sent Calle Jarnkrok to Calgary in exchange for Florida's second-round pick in 2022, a third-round pick in 2023 and this pick.
 The Edmonton Oilers' seventh-round pick will go to the Montreal Canadiens as the result of a trade on March 21, 2022, that sent Brett Kulak to Edmonton in exchange for William Lagesson, a conditional second-round pick in 2022 and this pick.
 The Ottawa Senators' seventh-round pick will go to the Toronto Maple Leafs as the result of a trade on July 11, 2022, that sent future considerations to Ottawa in exchange for Matt Murray, a third-round pick in 2023 and this pick.

Unresolved conditional draft picks
The following draft picks have been dealt with a condition attached that could not be resolved yet. They are listed below with round, teams, condition itself and further notes, e.g. the players or picks involved in the respective trade.

See also
 2021–22 NHL transactions
 2022–23 NHL transactions

 List of first overall NHL draft picks
 List of NHL players

References

External links
2024 NHL Entry Draft player stats at The Internet Hockey Database

NHL Entry Draft
NHL Entry Draft
National Hockey League Entry Draft
NHL Entry Draft